Tippah River is a stream in the U.S. state of Mississippi. It is a tributary of the Tallahatchie River.

Tippah is a name derived from the Choctaw language purported to mean "to eat one another", i.e. cannibalism. Variant names are "Tippah Creek" and Tippah River Canal".

References

Rivers of Mississippi
Rivers of Benton County, Mississippi
Rivers of Marshall County, Mississippi
Bodies of water of Tippah County, Mississippi
Mississippi placenames of Native American origin